Bidens aurea , the Arizona beggarticks,  is a North American species of flowering plant in the family Asteraceae. It is widespread across much of Mexico and found also in Arizona and Guatemala. The species is also naturalized in parts of Europe and South America.

Bidens aurea  is an annual herb occasionally reaching a height of 250 cm (100 inches). It produces numerous yellow or whitish flower heads containing both disc florets and ray florets. It grows primarily in wet areas such as marshes and streambanks.

References

aurea
Flora of Mexico
Flora of Arizona
Flora of Guatemala
Plants described in 1901